The Department of Science and Technology (abbreviated as DOST), is the executive department of the Philippine government responsible for the coordination of science and technology-related projects in the Philippines and to formulate policies and projects in the fields of science and technology in support of national development.

History
The DOST was formed as the National Science Development Board on June 13, 1958, during the administration of President Carlos P. Garcia. The science body was formed as a result of a law passed in the Congress upon the recommendation of Dr. Frank Co Tui, who was tasked by Garcia to conduct a survey regarding the state of science and technology in the country. It was reorganized as the National Science and Technology Authority (NSTA) on March 17, 1981, and was given broader policy-making and program implementing functions.

On January 30, 1987, during the administration of President Corazon Aquino, the NSTA was elevated to cabinet-level status with the signing of Executive Order 128, and was renamed as the Department of Science and Technology.

Functions

 Formulate and adopt a comprehensive National Science and Technology Plan, and monitor and coordinate its funding and implementation;
 Promote, assist and, where appropriate, undertake scientific and technological research and development in areas identified as vital to the country's development;
 Promote the development of indigenous technology and the adaptation and innovation of suitable imported technology, and in this regard, undertake technology development up to commercial stage;
 Undertake design and engineering works to complement research and development functions;
 Promote, assist and, where appropriate, undertake the transfer of the results of scientific and technological research and development to their end-users;
 Promote, assist and, where appropriate, undertake the technological services needed by agriculture, industry, transport, and the general public;
 Develop and maintain an information system and databank on science and technology;
 Develop and implement programs for strengthening scientific and technological capabilities through manpower training, infrastructure and institution-building;
 Promote public consciousness in science and technology; and
 Undertake policy research, technology assessment, feasibility and technical studies.

List of the Secretaries

Organizational structure
The department is headed by the Secretary of Science and Technology (Philippines), with the following four undersecretaries and three assistant secretaries
Undersecretary for Scientific and Technological Services
Undersecretary for Research and Development
Undersecretary for Regional Operations
Undersecretary for Disaster Risk Reduction and Climate Change (removed )
Assistant Secretary for Finance and Legal Affairs
Assistant Secretary for International Cooperation
Assistant Secretary for Administration

Offices

Collegial and scientific bodies
National Academy of Science and Technology (NAST)
Philippine Space Agency (PHILSA)
Natural Sciences Research Institute
Philippine Institute of Volcanology and Seismology (PHIVOLCS)

Sectoral planning councils
Philippine Council for Agriculture, Aquatic, and Natural Resources Research and Development (PCAARRD)
Philippine Council for Health Research and Development (PCHRD)
Philippine Council for Industry, Energy and Emerging Technology Research and Development (PCIEERD)

Research and development institutes
Advanced Science and Technology Institute (ASTI)
Food and Nutrition Research Institute (FNRI)
Forest Products Research Development Institute (FPRDI)
Industrial Technology Development Institute (ITDI)
Metal Industry Research and Development Center (MIRDC)
Philippine Nuclear Research Institute (PNRI)
Philippine Textile Research Institute (PTRI)

Scientific and technological services
Philippine Atmospheric, Geophysical and Astronomical Services Administration (PAGASA)
Philippine Institute of Volcanology and Seismology (PHIVOLCS)
Philippine Science High School System (PSHS)
Science and Technology Information Institute (STII)
Science Education Institute (SEI)
Technology Application and Promotion Institute (TAPI)
Technology Resource Center (TRC)

Projects 
 Automated Guideway Transit System project
 DOST Hybrid Electric Road Train
 DOST Hybrid Electric Train

See also
DOSTv: Science for the People
Philippine Space Agency
Science for Change

References

External links
Department of Science and Technology

 
Philippines
1987 establishments in the Philippines
Philippines, Science and Technology
Science and Technology
Establishments by Philippine executive order